Viktoria Yurievna Mullova (born 27 November 1959) is a Russian-born British violinist. She is best known for her performances and recordings of a number of violin concerti, compositions by J.S. Bach, and her innovative interpretations of popular and jazz compositions by Miles Davis, Duke Ellington, The Beatles, and others.

Biography and early career
Mullova was born in Zhukovsky, 45 km from Moscow, in Soviet Russia. At the age of 4, she was encouraged to start her violin training by her father Yuri Mullov, the Central Aerohydrodynamic Institute physicist and engineer. She remembered the whole experience of the Soviet quasi-religious state-sponsored musical education as an overly stressful nightmare full of hypocrisy: "Naturally, I have never believed in communism. But everything was a play. I knew I wanted to leave, and I was pretending to be a naive girl".

Defection
During a tour of Finland in 1983, Mullova and her lover, Vakhtang Jordania, who posed as her accompanist so they could defect together, left the hotel in Kuusamo, after Jordania told the KGB officer who was watching them that Mullova was too sick from drinking to attend the afterparty. The Stradivari violin owned by the Soviet Union was left behind on the hotel bed. A YLE  journalist Jyrki Koulumies, accompanied by a photographer Caj Sundman, drove them in a rented car across the border via Haparanda to Luleå, Sweden where they flew to Stockholm.

At that time, the Swedish police treated the young, on-the-run musicians just like any other political defectors from the Eastern Bloc: they suggested that the couple stay in a safehouse over the weekend until the American Embassy opened so they could apply for political asylum upon relocation. So for two days they sat under pseudonyms in a safehouse not even daring to go outside, because their photographs were on the front page of every Swedish and international newspaper. Two days later they arrived in Washington, D.C. with American visas in their pockets.

Life in the West
Mullova has made many recordings including her debut release of the Tchaikovsky and Jean Sibelius violin concertos which was awarded the Grand Prix du Disque.

She formed the Mullova Chamber Ensemble in the mid-1990s. The ensemble has toured Italy, Germany, and the Netherlands and has recorded the Bach violin concertos on Philips Classics. She was nominated for a 1995 Grammy Award for her recording of the Bach Partitas, and she won a 1995 Echo Klassik award, a Japanese Record Academy Award and a Deutsche Schallplattenkritik prize for her recording of the Brahms violin concerto. Her recording of the Brahms B major Trio (no. 1) and Beethoven's Archduke Trio with André Previn and Heinrich Schiff was released in 1995, receiving a further Diapason d'Or.

Mullova's international career as a soloist has included performances with the Royal Concertgebouw Orchestra, the Philharmonia, the Berlin Philharmonic, the Vienna Symphony, the Montreal Symphony Orchestra, the San Francisco Symphony and the Bavarian Radio Symphony Orchestra. She has also performed as soloist and director with the Orchestra of the Age of Enlightenment.

Mullova plays the Jules Falk Stradivarius from 1723 and a violin made in 1750 by Giovanni Battista Guadagnini. Her bows include a Baroque style bow by a Walter Barbiero, one of the finest makers of modern bows, a Dodd and a Voirin.

Personal life
Mullova currently lives in Holland Park, London, England, with her husband, cellist Matthew Barley, and three children: the jazz bassist Misha Mullov-Abbado, from her relationship with conductor and pianist Claudio Abbado; Katia, from her relationship with violinist Alan Brind; and Nadia, who is a dancer in the Royal Ballet, from her marriage to Barley.

Selected discography
Beethoven Violin Sonatas Nos. 3, 9 (Onyx 4050). With Kristian Bezuidenhout; 2010
JS Bach Sonatas & Partitas for violin solo (Onyx 4040); 2009
JS Bach Sonatas for violin and harpsichord (Onyx 4020).  With Ottavio Dantone; 2007
Vivaldi 5 violin concertos (Onyx 4001). With Il Giardino Armonico; 2005
Beethoven and Mendelssohn Violin Concertos (Philips, 473 872–2). With Orchestre Révolutionnaire et Romantique/John Eliot Gardiner; 2003
Mozart: Violin Concertos Nos. 1, 3-4 (Philips, 470 292). With Orchestra of the Age of Enlightenment; 2002
Through the Looking Glass (Philips, 464 184–2). With Matthew Barley and Between the Notes; 2000
Bartók and Stravinsky Violin Concertos (Philips, 456 542–2). With Los Angeles Philharmonic Orchestra/Esa-Pekka Salonen; 1997
Brahms Violin Sonatas (Philips, 446 709–2). With pianist Piotr Anderszewski; 1997
Tchaikovsky and Sibelius Violin Concertos(Philips 416 821–2) Boston Symphony Orchestra/Seiji Ozawa; 1985

See also
 List of Eastern Bloc defectors

Notes

References

External links 
 

British classical violinists
Soviet women musicians
Soviet classical violinists
British people of Russian descent
Soviet emigrants to the United Kingdom
20th-century classical violinists
Soviet defectors to the United States
Prize-winners of the International Tchaikovsky Competition
International Jean Sibelius Violin Competition prize-winners
Moscow Conservatory alumni
1959 births
Living people
Women classical violinists
20th-century women musicians
21st-century classical violinists
21st-century women musicians